Journal Citation Reports (JCR) is an annual publicationby Clarivate (previously the intellectual property of Thomson Reuters). It has been integrated with the Web of Science and is accessed from the Web of Science Core Collection. It provides information about academic journals in the natural sciences and social sciences, including impact factors. The JCR was originally published as a part of Science Citation Index. Currently, the JCR, as a distinct service, is based on citations compiled from the Science Citation Index Expanded and the Social Sciences Citation Index.

Basic journal information
The information given for each journal includes:
 the basic bibliographic information of publisher,  title abbreviation, language, ISSN
 the subject categories (there are 171 such categories in the sciences and 54 in the social sciences)

Citation information
 Basic citation data:
 the number of articles published during that year and
 the number of times the articles in the journal were cited during the year by later articles in itself and other journals,
 detailed tables showing
 the number of times the articles in the journal were cited during the year by later articles in itself and other journals,
 the number of citations made from articles published in the journal that year to it and other specific individual journals during each of the most recent ten years (the 20 journals most cited are included)
 the number of times articles published in the journal during each of the most recent 10 years were cited by individual specific journals during the year (the twenty journals with the greatest number of citations are given)
 and several measures derived from these data for a given journal: its impact factor, immediacy index, etc.

There are separate editions for the sciences and the social sciences; the 2013 science edition includes 8,411 journals, and the 2012 social science edition contains 3,016 titles. The issue for each year is published the following year after the citations for the year have been published and the information processed.

The publication is available online (JCR on the Web), or in CD format (JCR on CD-ROM); it was originally published in print, with the detailed tables on microfiche.

In general, various universities, administrative centers and ministries in charge of higher education make their evaluations of university professors and other researchers on the number and quality of articles published in journals indexed in the JCR.

Release schedule
In recent years, it is often released in the middle of June. For example, the 2017 Journal Citation Reports, based on 2016 data, was released on June 14, 2017.

Integrations
 Journal Citation Reports includes a beta for open access data which uses Unpaywall data.

Impact factor

See also
Journal metrics
Scopus

References

Citations

Sources

External links

Training Resources for Journal Citation Reports

Citation indices
Academic publishing
Clarivate